A knife rest is a piece of kitchenware for resting a used knife without touching the table to prevent cooking fluids from getting onto countertops.

Similar tools are the chopstick rest and spoon and chopstick rest used in Asian cuisine and the spoon rest.

History
Knife rests in their modern form were invented in the late 17th century or early 18th century, but earlier ones, possibly just wood, were used during the time of Henry VIII. They were invented to save the knife, fork, and tablecloth from being stained by cooking fluids. Later, however, they were developed in sets.

In the Victorian era, knife rests were created in a wide variety of materials, designs, and configurations. Materials used included gold, silver, mother of pearl, and ivory. The French also created knife rests, known as porte-couteaux. Russians, Germans, and other Europeans developed knife rests around this time. The Chinese created chopstick rests in the same manner.

From the late 19th century most knives were designed to be weighted towards the handle. For this reason late Victorian etiquette manuals mention that knife rests and worries about fouling the tablecloth had become unnecessary. Towards the middle of the 20th century it was often the case that heavy bone handles were replaced with lighter white plastic, which caused classic-style cutlery to again threaten tablecloths.

In the Western world, knife rests were used at table through the first half of the twentieth century, mainly by the upper classes, but now usually are purchased mostly as collector's items.

See also 
 Chopstick rest
 Spoon rest
 Spoon and chopstick rest

References

External links

Kitchenware